The Kirthar Mountains are a mountain range that mark the boundary between the Pakistani provinces of Balochistan and Sindh, and which comprise much of the Kirthar National Park. The mountain range forms part of the Kirthar-Sulaiman geological province, which stretches from the Arabian Sea coast north to the Sulaiman Mountains in northwest Pakistan.

Geography 
In total, the Kirthars cover an area of about 9,000 square kilometers. The Khasa Hills and Mulri Hills close to the Arabian Sea coast are sub-ranges of the Kirthar Mountains which extend into the city limits of Karachi. The mountains are drained by the Gaj River and Hub River.

Mountain peaks 
Barugh Hill is the highest mountain in the Sindh portion of the Kirthars. Barugh, means "big fat mountain" in the Brahui language, the language of the Sasoli tribe, who still live in the area.

The next highest peak is the  mountain  Kutte-Ji-Kabar (Sindhi for "Dog's Grave"), also known as Kuchak-na-Kabar in Brahui. The mountain is located in a region claimed by the provincial governments of Sindh and Balochistan. As recorded in Folk Tales of Scinde and Guzerat (circa 1855), the mountain is named for a story in which a Brahui man is forced to leave his dog as collateral to a wealthy Hindu merchant in order to settle his debts. According to the tale, the dog chased after thieves who had stolen from the merchant, leading the merchant to free him and return to his master. The Brahui man thought the dog escaped and so was angry with the dog for his disobedience. The rejected dog died, and when the Brahui man came to learn of the true story, he felt remorseful and climbed to the top of the mountain in order to bury his dog.

There are also a number of other peaks of the Kirthar Mountains exceeding , which all receive occasional snowfall during the winter season.

Passes 
There are several passes in the range which are passable, but the only one often used is the Gaji Lak Pass on the road from Zidi and Khuzdar to Jhalawan.

Geology 
The Kirthars consist of a series of parallel rock hill ridges oriented mostly north–south, with piedmont and piedmont-alluvial plains located between ridges, with dry riverbeds. The ridges rise rapidly over short distances between valleys and ridges.

The Kirthars are part of the Kirthar-Sulaiman geologic province, which stretches from the Arabian Sea coast north to northwestern Pakistan along the western boundary of the Indus Valley. The upper portions of the mountains are largely limestone, while the middle and southern portions of the mountain are shale which date to the middle Eocene era.

Settlement 
Within the Kirthar Mountains are 21 prehistoric sites. The 16th-18th century Taung Tombs are also located in the range. There are 71 tombs which situated in the area of the Chhuttas tribe. The inhabitants of the Kirthar Mountains are chiefly Chhutto people of Bhootani tribe, and various Sindhi and Balochi tribes who subsist by flock grazing. Major Baloch tribes living in the Kirthars are Chhutta, Burfat, Gabol, Marri, Bozdar, Lund, Nohani, Bugti, Chandio, and Lashari.

Gallery

See also
 List of mountain ranges of Pakistan
 List of mountains in Pakistan
 Bado Hill Station
 Pom pom

References

Mountains and hills of Karachi
Mountains and hills of Sindh
Mountain ranges of Balochistan (Pakistan)